Bradbury Mountain State Park is a public recreation area in the town of Pownal, Cumberland County, Maine, managed by the Department of Agriculture, Conservation and Forestry.

History
The park was created in the 1940s as one of Maine's original five state parks after the land was acquired from the Federal government in 1939. The park's borders were extended across Maine Route 9 with the addition of the Knight Woods parcels in the 1990s and 2000s.

Geology
The park's namesake has been described as a "small, inconspicuous hill, less than 500' high," that despite its size offers panoramic views that make the park one of the more popular ones in the state. The underlying material of granite and pegmatite is exposed at the summit.

Activities and amenities
The park's multi-use trails are used for hiking, snowmobiling and horseback riding. Most trails in the park are open to mountain bikers. Hiking is popular during all seasons, including winter.

References

External links
Bradbury Mountain State Park Department of Agriculture, Conservation and Forestry
Bradbury Mountain State Park Map (East) Department of Agriculture, Conservation and Forestry
Bradbury Mountain State Park Map (West) Department of Agriculture, Conservation and Forestry

State parks of Maine
State parks of the Appalachians
Protected areas of Cumberland County, Maine
Portland metropolitan area, Maine
Protected areas established in 1939
1939 establishments in Maine
Pownal, Maine
Mountains of Cumberland County, Maine
Campgrounds in Maine
Parks in Cumberland County, Maine